Joanna Semel Rose was an American art patron and collector, publisher, philanthropist, and connector, whose salons and dinners in her New York home brought together an international group of intellectuals, artists, authors and educators. For many decades the chairman of the board of Partisan Review magazine, she became known to the wider public from an award-winning exhibition of early American patchwork quilts from her collection that was mounted in honor of her 80th birthday.

Early years
Born in 1930 in Orange, New Jersey to Lillian Mindlin and Philip E. Semel, an attorney, Joanna Semel was notable from an early age for her prodigious memory and intellectual ability. As a teenager she was a radio Quiz Kid, selected as a guest editor of Mademoiselle magazine, editor in chief of the school newspaper and literary magazine and president and valedictorian of her class at Lawrence High School. After attending Bryn Mawr College from which she graduated summa cum laude and as class valedictorian and St. Hilda's College at Oxford University, she received a fellowship at the Royal Shakespeare Institute in Stratford-upon-Avon. Following her graduate work she served as Joseph L. Mankiewicz's assistant on the production of the Humphrey Bogart/Ava Gardner film The Barefoot Contessa, during which she played chess with Bogart between takes and had a cameo in the film as a bathing beauty. On returning to New York, she worked as a Broadway producer at the Theatre Guild.

Family and marriage
Joanna Semel came from a Jewish family among whose members were the activist and philanthropist Bernard Semel; Harry R. Socolof, the angel investor behind the first modern supermarket; and Max Weinberg, drummer for the E-Street Band. In 1956 she married real estate developer Daniel Rose and took his surname. Their four children include the entrepreneur and investor David S. Rose; Joseph B. Rose, who served for eight years as Chairman of the New York City Planning Commission; Emily Rose, a historian and award-winning author; and Gideon Rose, the former editor of Foreign Affairs.

Activities in the humanities
Joanna S. Rose joined the Publications and Advisory Board of Partisan Review magazine as its Secretary in 1969, was elected Co-Chair of the Board in 1975, and then sole Chair in 1977, a position she held until the magazine ceased publication in 2003. Elected to membership in the American Academy of Arts and Sciences in 2012, she was an Honorary Fellow of St. Hilda's College, Oxford University and a Distinguished Friend of Oxford University. She was an Associate Fellow of Berkeley College, Yale University and co-founded the Harlem Educational Activities Fund, which is dedicated to ensuring that students from Harlem and Washington Heights are prepared to enter selective colleges and universities. She served on the boards of the New York Council for the Humanities, the New York Institute for the Humanities at New York University, the advisory board of the CUNY Graduate Center for the Humanities, and the national advisory board of the W. E. B. Du Bois Research Institute. She was a founding board member of Poets & Writers, the National Dance Institute, the Paper Bag Players, the Bay Street Theatre in Sag Harbor, Long Island, and The American Friends of St Hilda's. Other boards on which she served included those of the British Institute, the Project for Public Spaces and Guild Hall of East Hampton, New York.

Collections
 Joanna S. Rose was a renowned collector who over her lifetime established significant collections across a wide array of subjects including Judaica, Pre-Columbian art, oriental rugs, paintings, Chinese opera gowns, Judith Leiber minaudières, and Christian Lacroix couture. Her collection of over 6,000 cookbooks was one of the largest in the country and the rare wine collection she assembled with her husband, Daniel, was the subject of the short film A Love Story: Dan & Joanna Rose...and Wine. Her botanical collection of varieties of roses, on annual display at her home in East Hampton, NY, was augmented by the 'Daniel Rose', a new hybrid plant she commissioned and named in honor of her husband.

She was best known to the public, however, for her collection of early American patchwork quilts. A selection of 651 quilts from her collection formed the exhibition Infinite Variety: Three Centuries of Red and White Quilts, mounted at the Park Avenue Armory by the American Folk Art Museum in 2011 in honor of her 80th birthday. With more than 25,000 visitors coming from around the world for the five day installation, the exhibition received massive press coverage, won multiple awards and resulted in a book that Vogue magazine described as "a perfect coffee-table topper that spans three centuries and includes a foreword by Martha Stewart." In 2021 she donated all 651 quilts and the Infinite Variety exhibition rights to the International Quilt Museum in Lincoln, Nebraska.

Arts patronage
In addition to commissioning, along with other Rose family members, notable artists to illustrate annual contributions to the Rose Family Seder Books which now repose at the New York Public Library, Joanna S. Rose herself conceived, commissioned and supervised the production of two major works of modern Judaica that she donated to the Morgan Library: The Rose Haggadah and The Book of Ruth, each illuminated by the modern manuscript artist and illuminator, Barbara Wolff. Her final commission, also illuminated by Wolff, was of an elaborate manuscript of The Song of Songs, which was still in production at the time of her death. Other works commissioned by Joanna Rose included paintings of East Hampton, Long Island and artist bindings of books by well-known authors of her acquaintance.

Philanthropy
She supported projects including the rehearsal studio of the Chamber Music Society of Lincoln Center, the Rose Center for Earth and Space at the American Museum of Natural History, Bryn Mawr College, the Trilling Seminars at Columbia University, and the Ladies Village Improvement Society of East Hampton, LI, and for many decades provided anonymous help for research and scholars in the humanities. When the John D. and Catherine T. MacArthur Foundation established the MacArthur Genius Grants in 1981, they turned to Joanna S. Rose as one of the initial secret 'nominators' to identify unsung 'geniuses' as potential recipients.

Entertaining
Widely regarded as one of the leading hostesses in New York, Joanna S. Rose's parties on behalf of the New York Public Library, the New York Council for the Humanities, Eldridge Street Synagogue, and other charitable institutions achieved near legendary status. Events with titles such as The Feast of the Pheasant and Talleyrand Entertains Metternich at the Congress of Vienna brought together university presidents, international diplomats, award-winning writers and renowned artists. A film produced in honor of Joanna S. Rose and her husband, Daniel, featured contributions from, among other friends, Fareed Zakaria, Neil de Grasse Tyson, and Andre Soltner.

Books dedicated to Joanna S. Rose and her husband, Daniel, include George Steiner's In Bluebeard's Castle, Henry Louis Gates, Jr.'s Life Upon These Shores—Looking at African American History, Geoffrey Hartman's Scars of the Spirit, Fareed Zakaria's "Ten Lessons for a Post-Pandemic World", and David S. Rose's The Startup Checklist.

Awards
Joanna Rose was honored, along with her husband, with the Mayor's Award of Honor for Arts and Culture from the City of New York and the Joseph Papp Racial Harmony Award from the Foundation for Ethnic Understanding. The main-belt asteroid 70712 Danieljoanna, discovered by the Catalina Sky Survey in 1999, was named in their honor, while 70718 HEAF was named for the Harlem Educational Activities Fund (HEAF) that they founded.

References

External links

1930 births
2021 deaths
American collectors
American women philanthropists
Bryn Mawr College alumni
Alumni of the University of Oxford
People from Orange, New Jersey
20th-century American Jews
American art patrons
20th-century American philanthropists
21st-century American philanthropists
20th-century women philanthropists
21st-century women philanthropists